Clone Theory is an EP by Six Finger Satellite, released on June 28, 1996, through Load Records.

Track listing

Personnel 
Six Finger Satellite
James Apt – bass guitar, clarinet, additional vocals
John MacLean – guitar, synthesizer
Richard Ivan Pelletier – drums, drum machine
Jeremiah Ryan – vocals, Moog synthesizer

References 

1996 EPs
Load Records EPs
Six Finger Satellite albums